The New Quartet is an album by Gary Burton. Released by ECM Records in 1973 (as ECM 1030). Burton’s ‘New Quartet’ consists of guitarist Mick Goodrick, bassist Abraham Laboriel and drummer Harry Blazer.

Track listing
"Open Your Eyes, You Can Fly" (Chick Corea) - 6:40
"Coral" (Keith Jarrett) - 4:03
"Tying Up Loose Ends" (Gordon Beck) - 5:12
"Brownout" (Gary Burton) - 6:32
"Olhos de Gato" (Carla Bley) - 5:38
"Mallet Man" (Gordon Beck) - 7:11
"Four Or Less" (Mike Gibbs) - 6:10
"Nonsequence" (Mike Gibbs) - 4:30

Personnel
Gary Burton – vibraphone
Michael Goodrick – guitar
Abraham Laboriel – bass
Harry Blazer – drums

References

Gary Burton albums
1973 albums
ECM Records albums
Albums produced by Manfred Eicher